The following is the final results of the 2001 World Wrestling Championships. Freestyle competition were held in Sofia, Bulgaria and Greco-Roman competition were held in Patras, Greece.

Medal table

Team ranking

Medal summary

Men's freestyle

Men's Greco-Roman

Women's freestyle

Participating nations

Freestyle
322 competitors from 52 nations participated.

 (4)
 (1)
 (5)
 (11)
 (2)
 (14)
 (11)
 (6)
 (8)
 (4)
 (3)
 (2)
 (2)
 (4)
 (8)
 (13)
 (4)
 (11)
 (6)
 (8)
 (8)
 (1)
 (2)
 (14)
 (6)
 (7)
 (4)
 (1)
 (3)
 (4)
 (11)
 (3)
 (2)
 (3)
 (3)
 (13)
 (3)
 (4)
 (14)
 (4)
 (1)
 (11)
 (4)
 (3)
 (4)
 (12)
 (3)
 (14)
 (14)
 (7)
 (8)
 (4)

Greco-Roman
243 competitors from 53 nations participated.

 (5)
 (3)
 (2)
 (4)
 (8)
 (1)
 (8)
 (2)
 (2)
 (5)
 (2)
 (8)
 (1)
 (6)
 (2)
 (1)
 (4)
 (7)
 (5)
 (8)
 (8)
 (7)
 (8)
 (8)
 (8)
 (6)
 (1)
 (7)
 (5)
 (2)
 (2)
 (1)
 (2)
 (4)
 (3)
 (3)
 (8)
 (1)
 (6)
 (8)
 (2)
 (8)
 (2)
 (6)
 (4)
 (8)
 (1)
 (1)
 (8)
 (8)
 (7)
 (3)
 (3)

References
 UWW Database
 Greco-Roman website (Archived 2009-10-01)
 Freestyle website

 
World Wrestling Championships
W
W
W
Sports competitions in Patras
Sports competitions in Sofia
International wrestling competitions hosted by Greece
International wrestling competitions hosted by Bulgaria
World Wrestling Championships
2000s in Sofia
World Wrestling Championships